Murfreesboro is a city in, and the county seat of, Pike County, Arkansas, United States.  Its population was 1,641 at the 2010 census.  The city is known for the Crater of Diamonds State Park located south of the city.

History
In 1906, diamonds were found on a local farm.  It was determined that an 80-acre (32 ha) volcanic formation was the source of the diamonds. The property was eventually sold to the state of Arkansas, which opened the 37-acre Crater of Diamonds State Park to the public.  As a tourist attraction a daily fee ($10 in 2021) is charged to search for diamonds.

Also located in Murfreesboro is the 1,000-year-old Ka-Do-Ha Indian Village and museum dedicated to it, which offers a field that can be excavated for authentic arrowheads.

Geography
Murfreesboro is located at  (34.066255, -93.689256).

Demographics

2020 census

As of the 2020 United States census, there were 1,495 people, 769 households, and 511 families residing in the city.

2000 census
As of the census of 2000, there were 1,764 people, 732 households, and 485 families residing in the city. The racial makeup of the city was 89.23% White, 7.31% Black or African American, 1.08% Native American, 0.11% Asian, 0.91% from other races, and 1.36% from two or more races.  1.36% of the population were Hispanic or Latino of any race.

There were 732 households, out of which 30.2% had children under the age of 18 living with them, 51.5% were married couples living together, 12.3% had a female householder with no husband present, and 33.7% were non-families. 31.1% of all households were made up of individuals, and 18.7% had someone living alone who was 65 years of age or older.  The average household size was 2.32 and the average family size was 2.89.

In the city, the population was spread out, with 24.4% under the age of 18, 6.3% from 18 to 24, 26.0% from 25 to 44, 22.4% from 45 to 64, and 20.9% who were 65 years of age or older.  The median age was 40 years. For every 100 females, there were 85.9 males.  For every 100 females age 18 and over, there were 81.7 males.

The median income for a household in the city was $26,806, and the median income for a family was $33,456. Males had a median income of $26,300 versus $18,523 for females. The per capita income for the city was $17,124.  About 11.0% of families and 14.1% of the population were below the poverty line, including 13.7% of those under age 18 and 16.3% of those age 65 or over.

Education 
Public education for elementary and secondary school students is provided by South Pike County School District, which includes:
 Murfreesboro Elementary School, serving prekindergarten through grade 6.
 Murfreesboro High School, serving grades 7 through 12.

On July 1, 2010, the Murfreesboro School District and the Delight School District merged to form the South Pike County School District. The Murfreesboro district absorbed the Delight district and then changed its name to South Pike County School District.

References

External links
 Official Murfreesboro City website
 Ka-Do-Ha Indian Village

Cities in Pike County, Arkansas
Cities in Arkansas
County seats in Arkansas